Gerald Nicosia (born November 18, 1949, in Berwyn, Illinois) is an American author, poet, journalist, interviewer, and literary critic. He is based in Marin County, California.

About 
Nicosia received a B.A. and an M.A. in English and American Literature, with Highest Distinction in English, from the University of Illinois at Chicago in 1971 and 1973 respectively.

Nicosia has written book reviews for the past 25 years for many major American newspapers, including The Washington Post, the Chicago Tribune, The Kansas City Star, the San Francisco Chronicle, the Oakland Tribune, and the Los Angeles Times.

Nicosia is best known as a biographer of Jack Kerouac. His highly regarded Memory Babe: A Critical Biography of Jack Kerouac (1983) was reissued in March 2022 with new material by Noodlebrain Press. He had also been an advocate and supporter of the late Jan Kerouac, Jack's estranged daughter. In January 2009, Nicosia edited and published Jan Kerouac: A Life in Memory, containing photos and written essays and remembrances about her.

In 2001, Nicosia's book Home to War was published and covers the problems faced by Vietnam Veterans returning to an ungrateful nation. It also discusses the battle to stop the use of Agent Orange.
In 2020, Nicosia's book "BEAT Scrapbook" was published by coolgrove press. It contains highly personal poems by the author, many of which poems are addressed to Beat literary icons Nicosia knew as colleagues and friends.

Nicosia is currently working on a full-length critical biography of the pioneer black writer Ntozake Shange, which will be published by St. Martin's Press.

Bibliography

Bughouse Blues (Vantage Press, 1977) 
Memory Babe (Grove Press, 1983, reprint: University of California Press, 1994) 
 Lunatics, Lovers, Poets, Vets & Bargirls (Host Publications, 1991) 
 Home to War (Carroll & Graf, 2001, new edition, 2004) 
 Love, California Style (12 Gauge Press, 2002) 
 Jan Kerouac: A Life in Memory (Noodlebrain Press, Corte Madera, CA; 2009) 
 One and Only: The Untold Story of "On the Road Co-authored by Anne Marie Santos (Berkeley: Cleis Press/Viva Editions, 2011) 
 Night Train to Shanghai (Grizzly Peak Press, Kensington, CA; 2014) 
 The Last Days of Jan Kerouac (Noodlebrain Press, 2016) 
 Kerouac: The Last Quarter Century (Noodlebrain Press, 2019) 
 BEAT Scrapbook (coolgrove press, Brooklyn, NY, 2020)

References

External links
Official Website
PEN Oakland Official Website
Interview with Gerald Nicosia by Jonah Raskin, The Rag Blog, April 26, 2012]
Beat Scrapbook Book Review by Jim Feast, Sensitive Skin Magazine, September 9, 2020
Review of Beat Scrapbook by Jeff Kaliss,  Mill Valley Literary Review,  Issue #19.

American biographers
American literary critics
Living people
1949 births
University of Illinois Chicago alumni
Jack Kerouac
People from Berwyn, Illinois
20th-century American journalists
American male journalists
American male non-fiction writers